West Coast Bad Boyz II is the third West Coast Bad Boyz compilation released by No Limit Records. It was released on January 28, 1997, and was produced by some of the West Coast's top acts, including Brotha Lynch Hung, C-Bo and JT the Bigga Figga. West Coast Bad Boyz was a success, peaking at number 8 on the Billboard 200 and number 6 on the Top R&B/Hip-Hop Albums. Both the album and its opening song were dedicated to the memory of Tupac Shakur. It is certified Gold by the RIAA.

Track listing

References

Albums produced by E-A-Ski
1997 compilation albums
No Limit Records compilation albums
Priority Records compilation albums
Gangsta rap compilation albums